Richard Whithed or Richard Whitehead may refer to:

 Richard Whitehead (Hampshire MP) (1594–c. 1663), aka Richard Whithed, soldier in Parliamentary army in the English Civil War, MP between 1628 and 1653
 Richard Whithed (Stockbridge MP) (died 1693), English politician, MP for Stockbridge 1689–93

See also 
 Whithed (disambiguation)